Feliks Żukowski (30 May 1904 – 17 January 1976) was a Polish actor and theatre director. He worked in theatres in Warsaw, Vilnius, Lublin, Częstochowa and Łódź. Feliks was a manager of Stefan Jaracz Teatr in Olsztyn. He was also a soldier of Armia Krajowa, prisoner of Sachsenhausen concentration camp.

Notable roles
Films
 Młody las (1934)
Robert and Bertram (1938)
 Złota Maska (1939)
 Zakazane piosenki (1946)
 Jasne łany (1947)
 Celuloza (1953)
 Przygoda na Mariensztacie (1953)
 Piątka z ulicy Barskiej (1954)
 Niedaleko Warszawy (1954)
 Skarb kapitana Martensa (1957)
 Krzyżacy (1960)
 Hubal (1973)
 Gniazdo (1974)
Theatre
 Igraszki z diabłem (1948 and 1962)
 Don Carlos (1956)
 Żywy trup (1961)
TV series
 Stawka większa niż życie (1967–1968)
 Chłopi (1972)

Notable director's works
 Kariera Artura Ui (1962)
 Jegor Bułyczow i inni (1970)

References

External links
 
 Feliks Żukowski at Filmpolski.pl 
 Feliks Żukowski at Filmweb 

Polish male film actors
Polish male stage actors
Polish male television actors
Polish theatre directors
1904 births
1976 deaths
20th-century Polish male actors
Recipients of the State Award Badge (Poland)